Ruperts, sometimes also written Rupert's, is a village of the island of Saint Helena, in Saint Helena, Ascension and Tristan da Cunha, an overseas territory of the United Kingdom, in the South Atlantic Ocean.

History

It is believed that the village was named after Prince Rupert of the Rhine (1619–1682), but it is uncertain.

Geography

Ruperts belongs to the district of Jamestown, It is 3.5 km by road from Jamestown but is, as the crow flies, only 660 meters away from it, separated by a hill.

The village is composed by the zones of Rupert's Valley, inner and between two hills, and Rupert's Wharf, by the sea and in front of Rupert's Bay. Ruperts' main road runs into the valley to the harbour area, and the settlements spans on it for about 800 m.

Transport
Ruperts main street forks into two roads: Field Road to Jamestown (3.5 km), Briars (2 km) and Alarm Forest (4.5 km); and Airport Access Road to Longwood (7 km) and Saint Helena Airport (13.7 km).

It is a port village with a small harbour by Rupert's Bay, with a wharf, a fuel gantry and expanded with the opening of a new jetty, for largest ships, in February 2020. In early 20th century Ruperts had a small narrow gauge railway, by the seashore, serving the local desalination plant. The Ruperts Railway had a small fork to the valley.

Gallery

See also

Jacob's Ladder (Saint Helena)
List of towns in Saint Helena, Ascension and Tristan da Cunha

References

External links

Ruperts (St. Helena official website)
Ruperts (Archaeology Data Service)

Jamestown, Saint Helena
Populated places in Saint Helena, Ascension and Tristan da Cunha